Charlie Doherty (23 January 1876 – 5 March 1961) was an Australian rules footballer who played with Fitzroy in the Victorian Football League (VFL).

References

Sources
Holmesby, Russell & Main, Jim (2009). The Encyclopedia of AFL Footballers. 8th ed. Melbourne: Bas Publishing.

 

Australian rules footballers from Victoria (Australia)
Fitzroy Football Club players
1876 births
1961 deaths